NetPresenz, written by Peter N. Lewis for Stairways Software Pty Ltd, is a World Wide Web and FTP server developed for use on the classic Mac OS. It is an update of an older product called simply FTPd, at the time the most significant FTP daemon available for the Macintosh platform, with added Web and Gopher functionality.

Originally a shareware package, NetPresenz was rendered obsolete by increasing functionality in the Mac OS and has been made freeware. It does not work on macOS.

References

External links
Netpresez 4.1 manual PDF

Macintosh-only software
Web server software
Gopher (protocol)
Freeware